Sanna Margit Valkonen (born 12 December 1977) is a Finnish former football defender. She played for KontU, PuiU, MPS Malmin and HJK Helsinki in the Naisten Liiga, Boston Renegades in the W-League, and Umeå IK, AIK Fotboll and KIF Örebro in the Damallsvenskan. She was named Finnish Footballer of the Year in 2001 and 2002.

She was a member of the Finnish national team for fifteen years, and played the 2005 and 2009 European Championships, serving as the team's captain. She was as of 2014 the second most capped Finnish player with 120 games, behind only Laura Österberg Kalmari with 130.

Titles
 2 UEFA Women's Cups (2003, 2004)
 5 Finnish Leagues (1994, 1998, 1999, 2000, 2001)
 6 Finnish Cups (1996, 1997, 1998, 1999, 2000, 2002)
 2 Swedish Leagues (2002, 2005)
 3 Swedish Cups (2002, 2003, 2010)

References

External links

 

1977 births
Living people
Finnish women's footballers
Finland women's international footballers
Finnish expatriate footballers
Expatriate women's footballers in Sweden
Expatriate women's soccer players in the United States
FIFA Century Club
KIF Örebro DFF players
Damallsvenskan players
Umeå IK players
AIK Fotboll (women) players
Kansallinen Liiga players
Helsingin Jalkapalloklubi (women) players
USL W-League (1995–2015) players
Finnish expatriate sportspeople in Sweden
Finnish expatriate sportspeople in the United States
People from Hyvinkää
Women's association football defenders
Sportspeople from Uusimaa
Boston Renegades players